State Road 249 (NM 249) is a  state highway in the US state of New Mexico. NM 249's western terminus is at NM 2 in Hagerman, and the eastern terminus is at U.S. Route 82 (US 82) east of Maljamar.

Major intersections

See also

References

249
Transportation in Chaves County, New Mexico
Transportation in Lea County, New Mexico